The Life and Loves of a She-Devil is a 1986 award-winning BBC drama serial adapted from Fay Weldon's 1983 novel The Life and Loves of a She-Devil.  Fay Weldon's novel was later filmed as the 1989 US comedy film She Devil.

Plot
The story concerns married couple Ruth and Bobbo, who are on the verge of separating as Bobbo is having an affair with romantic novelist Mary Fisher. After Bobbo leaves Ruth and moves in with Mary, Ruth develops a plan to get her revenge on both of them.

Cast
The cast of the drama includes:
 Dennis Waterman as Bobbo
 Patricia Hodge as Mary Fisher
 Julie T. Wallace as Ruth
 Miriam Margolyes as Nurse Hopkins
 John Bluthal as Angus
 John Rowe as Dr. Rohn
 Stephen Greif as Dr. Ghengis
 Tom Baker as Father Ferguson
 Bernard Hepton as Judge Bissop

Production

Writing
The adaption by Ted Whitehead was faithful to the novel with only minor changes from the book.

Locations
It was partly shot at the Belle Tout Lighthouse at Beachy Head near Eastbourne in East Sussex.

Episodes

Awards

References

External links
 
 The Life and Loves of a She-Devil at BBC
 

1980s British drama television series
1986 British television series debuts
1986 British television series endings
1980s British television miniseries
BAFTA winners (television series)
BBC television dramas
Films directed by Philip Saville
English-language television shows